Philip Crolly was appointed  Vicar Apostolic to administer the See of Clogher by Pope Innocent X on 15 November 1651 and re-appointed on 17 April 1657 by Pope Alexander VII.

See also
Roman Catholic Diocese of Clogher

References

17th-century Irish Roman Catholic priests
Apostolic vicars